Planet Raptor is a 2007 science-fiction made-for-television film directed by Gary Jones. It is a sequel to the 2004 television film, Raptor Island. Steven Bauer returned in this sequel playing a different role. It was entirely filmed in Romania. The film premiered in the United States on 25 January 2009 but was previously released on DVD in Brazil and Japan.

Alternate titles
The film is also known as Raptor Planet 2, Raptor Island 2: Raptor Planet, Jurassic Planet.

Plot
In 2066, the planet is entirely occupied by raptors. The only hope for the human race is a group of marines.

Cast
 Steven Bauer as Captain Mace Carter
 Vanessa Angel as Dr. Anna Rogers
 Ted Raimi as Tygoon
 Musetta Vander as Sergeant Jacqueline Moore
 Peter Jason as "Pappy"

External links

American natural horror films
2007 horror films
Action television films
American thriller television films
American horror thriller films
American action horror films
American science fiction horror films
Films about dinosaurs
Syfy original films
2007 television films
Films set in 2066
2000s science fiction horror films
2007 action thriller films
2007 films
Films directed by Gary Jones
Films shot in Romania
Films set in the 2060s
2000s English-language films
2000s American films